The 2019 Illinois Fighting Illini football team represented the University of Illinois at Urbana–Champaign in the 2019 NCAA Division I FBS football season. The Fighting Illini played their home games at Memorial Stadium in Champaign, Illinois, and competed in the West Division of the Big Ten Conference. They were led by fourth-year head coach Lovie Smith.

Previous season
The 2018 team finished the season 4–8 overall, 2–7 in Big Ten play to finish in last place in the West Division.

Preseason

Preseason Big Ten poll
Although the Big Ten Conference has not held an official preseason poll since 2010, Cleveland.com has polled sports journalists representing all member schools as a de facto preseason media poll since 2011. For the 2019 poll, Illinois was projected to finish in last in the West Division.

Schedule
Illinois' 2019 schedule began with three non-conference games, starting with Akron of the Mid-American Conference at home, a road game to UConn of the American Athletic Conference, and then at home again for Eastern Michigan of the Mid-American Conference. In Big Ten Conference play, Illinois played all members of the West Division and draws Michigan, Rutgers, and Michigan State from the East Division.

Game summaries

Akron

at UConn

Eastern Michigan

Nebraska

at Minnesota

Michigan

Wisconsin

“KAM'S Miracle” 

On October 19th, during the Homecoming Weekend, the Fighting Illini upset the undefeated No. 6 ranked Wisconsin Badgers on a 39-yard game-winning field goal by James McCourt. It was Illinois' first win against a top ranked team since 2007, when they had upset No. 1 ranked Ohio State in Columbus with a score of 28–21. 

The weekend also marked the last nights of beloved campus bar KAM'S. KAM'S had been a popular bar on campus since 1975. In September 2019 it was announced that KAM'S would be closing on Sunday night of Homecoming 2019. The victory coincided with this closing.

at Purdue

Rutgers

at Michigan State

“The Comeback In East Lansing”

Illinois started the road game off rough, giving up 14 points and only scoring a field goal in the first quarter. By halftime, they were losing 28–10 and at one point in a 28–3 deficit in the second quarter. After Halftime, both teams struggled in the 3rd quarter, scoring only 3 combined points. But the comeback started in the 4th quarter on which the first play was an Illinois touchdown on a 46-yard Brandon Peters pass to wide receiver Josh Imatorbhebhe. Then on the next Illinois possession, Reggie Corbin ran it in the end zone from 6-yards out to make the score 31–24. On the next Spartans possession, Michigan State's quarterback Brian Lewerke couldn't handle a bad snap and Illinois recovered the fumble at Michigan State's 8-yard line. Peters then tried throwing the game tying touchdown pass but it was intercepted in the end zone by MSU. On the ensuing possession, Lewerke threw an interception to Illinois defender Sydney Brown for a 76-yard touchdown. But the score remained untied when Illinois kicker junior James McCourt missed the PAT to make it 31–30. Michigan State then drove down the field but only managed to kick a field goal to make the score 34–30, MSU leading with 3:17 remaining in the 4th. Illinois drove down the field, completing a 37-yard throw and catch by Peters to Imatorbhebhe and drove to the MSU 4-yard line. The Spartans defense then held and stopped the Illini on 4th and Goal but a defensive pass interference kept the game alive. Brandon Peters then completed a 6-yard, game-winning touchdown to tight end Daniel Barker with 5 seconds remaining. Illinois stopped Michigan State on the kickoff, sealing a Fighting Illini win. The victory clinched a bowl game for the Illini, their first since 2014.

at Iowa

Northwestern

vs. California

Personnel

Coaching staff
Staff as of April 17, 2019.

Roster

Recruiting

|}

Incoming Transfers

Key:

(RS) = Redshirt

(I) = Ineligible/Sitting out

References

Illinois
Illinois Fighting Illini football seasons
Illinois Fighting Illini football